Dante D'Ambrosi (23 February 1902 – 22 June 1965) was an Italian composer. His work was part of the music event in the art competition at the 1936 Summer Olympics.

References

External links
 

1902 births
1965 deaths
Italian male composers
Olympic competitors in art competitions
Musicians from Rome
20th-century Italian male musicians